The State Register of Heritage Places is maintained by the Heritage Council of Western Australia. , 193 places are heritage-listed in the City of Gosnells, of which six are on the State Register of Heritage Places.

List
The Western Australian State Register of Heritage Places, lists the following six state registered places within the City of Gosnells:

References

Gosnells